Marc H. Plante is a Canadian politician in Quebec, who was elected to the National Assembly of Quebec in the 2014 election. He represents the electoral district of Maskinongé as a member of the Quebec Liberal Party.

Prior to his election to the legislature, Plante was a constituency assistant to Francine Gaudet and Jean-Paul Diamond, his predecessors as MNA for Maskinongé.

References

Quebec Liberal Party MNAs
Living people
French Quebecers
21st-century Canadian politicians
Year of birth missing (living people)